Sindoropsis is a genus of flowering plants in thefamily, Fabaceae. It belongs to the subfamily Detarioideae. It contains a single species, Sindoropsis letestui.

References

Detarioideae
Monotypic Fabaceae genera